Dražan Jerković (6 August 1936 – 9 December 2008) was a Yugoslav and Croatian professional football manager and player. His professional playing career spanned from 1954 to 1966, during which he played for Dinamo Zagreb and AA La Gantoise.

His first name is sometimes (incorrectly) spelled "Dražen". He was born in Šibenik, at the time in the Kingdom of Yugoslavia.

Playing career

Club
Jerković played for Dinamo Zagreb (1954–65). Severe injuries forced him to retire early, at the height of his career. With Dinamo he won the league title in 1958, and league cup in 1960 and 1965. In 315 games for Dinamo, he scored 300 goals.

International
He played internationally for Yugoslavia between 1960 and 1964, scoring 11 goals in 21 games. He participated in the 1960 European Championship and the 1962 FIFA World Cup. He was also part of the Yugoslav squad for the 1958 FIFA World Cup, but did not play.

In UEFA Euro 1960, he scored two goals against France in the semifinal, which Yugoslavia won (5–4). In the final, Yugoslavia lost against USSR (1–2; AET), finishing second.

In the 1962 FIFA World Cup, Jerković scored four goals and was, with five other players, the top goalscorer, winning the World Cup Golden Boot. Yugoslavia finished in fourth place. In the quarter-final, Yugoslavia beat Germany, while in the semifinal they lost to Czechoslovakia (1–3) and lost to Chile in the third place match (0–1).

Jerković played in a single international match with Croatia, as the Croatia national team was assembled in communist Yugoslavia once for a friendly against Indonesia in 1956. His final international was a September 1964 friendly match against Austria.

Managerial career
Dražan Jerković was also the first manager of the Croatia national team since independence, between 1990 and 1992. He died on 6 December 2008 in Zagreb.

Career statistics

Club

International

References

 
 Nogometni leksikon (2004, in Croatian)

1936 births
2008 deaths
Sportspeople from Šibenik
Association football forwards
Yugoslav footballers
Yugoslavia international footballers
Croatian footballers
Croatia international footballers
Dual internationalists (football)
1960 European Nations' Cup players
1958 FIFA World Cup players
1962 FIFA World Cup players
GNK Dinamo Zagreb players
K.A.A. Gent players
Yugoslav First League players
Belgian Pro League players
Yugoslav expatriate footballers
Expatriate footballers in Belgium
Yugoslav expatriate sportspeople in Belgium
Yugoslav football managers
GNK Dinamo Zagreb managers
FC Kärnten managers
HNK Cibalia managers
NK Zagreb managers
Yugoslavia national football team managers
Croatian football managers
Croatia national football team managers
Yugoslav expatriate football managers
Expatriate football managers in Austria
Yugoslav expatriate sportspeople in Austria